Robichaud v Canada (Treasury Board), [1987] 2 S.C.R. 84 is a leading case decided by the Supreme Court of Canada on sexual harassment under the Canadian Human Rights Act. The Court found that a corporation can be found liable for the discriminatory conduct of its employees who are acting "in the course of their employment." It also found it necessary to impose liability, as the employer is the only one that is in the position to remedy the discriminatory conduct.

See also
Human rights in Canada
Strathclyde Regional Council v Porcelli

External links
 

Canadian civil rights case law
History of human rights in Canada
Supreme Court of Canada cases
1987 in Canadian case law
Supreme Court of Canada case articles without infoboxes
Sexual harassment in Canada
Harassment case law